Mabinogi may refer to:

The Four Branches of the Mabinogi, a group of interrelated medieval Welsh prose tales
Mabinogi (video game), a Korean video game
Mabinogi (album), an arrange album of music from the visual novel Clannad
Y Mabinogi, a 2003 Welsh film

See also
Mabinogion, a collection of eleven prose stories collated from medieval Welsh manuscripts
Mabinogi Heroes (video game), a spin-off of the video game Mabinogi